Soncino may refer to:

Places 
 Soncino, Lombardy, a comune of the Province of Cremona, Italy

People 
 Soncino family (printers), an Italian family of Jewish printers
 Scipione Barbò Soncino (or Scipione Barbuo), a 16th-century Italian jurist and writer, active in Padua

Other uses 
 Battle of Soncino, a battle in the Wars in Lombardy fought in 1431
 Soncino Books of the Bible, a set of Hebrew Bible commentaries
 Soncino Press, a modern English publisher specialising in Jewish subjects